The Meitei Yelhou Mayek or the Meetei Yelhou Mayek may refer to:
 Meitei Mayek, the generally accepted Meitei script
Naoriya Phulo script, the invented Meitei Yelhou Mayek script